Dorka is a village in Russia.

Dorka may also refer to:

 Dorka Gryllus (born 1972), Hungarian actress
 Gertrud Dorka (1893–1976), German archaeologist, prehistorian and museum director